Khadar may refer to:

 Khadar, Fars, a village in Jahrom Country, Fars Province, Iran
 Khadar, Razavi Khorasan, a city  in Torqabeh and Shandiz County, Razavi Khorasan Province, Iran
 a terms for certain alluvial soils

People with the surname
 Abdul Khadar (1951–2002), Pashtun leader in Afghanistan
 U. T. Khadar, Indian politician